CenturyTel of Chester, Inc. is a telephone operating company owned by CenturyLink that provides local telephone service in Chester, Iowa and areas of Minnesota directly north.

The company was established in 1961 as the Chester Telephone Company. The company was acquired by Century Telephone and changed its corporate name to Century Telephone Company of Chester, Inc. in 1995. In 1998, Century Telephone shortened its name to CenturyTel and the Ohio company changed its corporate name to CenturyTel of Chester, Inc., a name it retains today.

The company does business as CenturyLink, a name it adopted in 2009 following the acquisition of Embarq.

References

See also
CenturyLink

Telecommunications companies established in 1961
Lumen Technologies
Communications in Iowa
Communications in Minnesota
Telecommunications companies of the United States
1961 establishments in Iowa